Yab Niya (born 18 October 1994) is an Indian cricketer. He made his List A debut on 11 October 2019, for Arunachal Pradesh in the 2019–20 Vijay Hazare Trophy. He made his Twenty20 debut on 8 November 2019, for Arunachal Pradesh in the 2019–20 Syed Mushtaq Ali Trophy. He made his first-class debut on 9 December 2019, for Arunachal Pradesh in the 2019–20 Ranji Trophy.

References

External links
 

1994 births
Living people
Indian cricketers
Arunachal Pradesh cricketers
Place of birth missing (living people)